Esfajin (also Romanized as Esfajīn and Esfejīn; also known as Isbadzhin and Isbājin) is a village in Zanjanrud-e Bala Rural District, in the Central District of Zanjan County, Zanjan Province, Iran. At the 2006 census, its population was 835, in 201 families.

References 

Populated places in Zanjan County